Chasing Tail is an American television reality TV show airing on The History Channel. It follows pest control specialists in Connecticut trying to control deer populations. The first episodes aired in April 2013.

External links

 
 

History (American TV channel) original programming
2013 American television series debuts
2010s American reality television series
2013 American television series endings
Television shows set in Connecticut